Kristine Elizabeth Moore Gebbie (June 26, 1943 – May 17, 2022) was an American academic and public health official working as a professor at the Flinders University School of Nursing & Midwifery in Adelaide, Australia. Gebbie previously served as the AIDS Policy Coordinator (or "AIDS Czar") from 1993 to 1994.

Early life and education 
Gebbie was born in Sioux City, Iowa on June 26, 1943, the daughter of Irene (Stewart), who worked for the U.S. Fish and Wildlife Service, and Thomas Moore, a career officer in the Army. She was raised in Miles City, Montana and Albuquerque, New Mexico.

Gebbie earned a Bachelor of Science in Nursing from St. Olaf College and Master of Science in Nursing from the University of California, Los Angeles. She also held a Doctor of Public Health in Health Policy from the University of Michigan School of Public Health in 1995.

Career 
Before joining the White House, Gebbie was the Secretary of the Washington State Department of Health (1989 to 1993) and was previously the director of the Oregon Department of Health.

Gebbie is best known for being the first U.S. AIDS Czar, from 1993 to 1994, during the Clinton Administration. She was a member of the President's Commission on the HIV Epidemic, formed by President Reagan, and an outspoken opponent of the Reagan Administration policies on AIDS testing.

From 2008 to 2010, she was the Joan Hansen Grabe Dean of the Hunter-Bellevue School of Nursing at Hunter College. Before moving to Hunter College, Gebbie was the Elizabeth Standish Gill Professor at the Columbia University School of Nursing and Director of Columbia's Center for Health Policy.

Gebbie was a founding member of the National Board of Public Health Examiners, an organization that provides the first and only core certification for public health professionals and graduates of CEPH-accredited institutions.

Personal life 
Gebbie had three children with her first husband, Neil Gebbie. Her second marriage was to a physician, Lester Nils Wright, who died in April 2022. Gebbie died in Adelaide, Australia on May 17, 2022, from cancer.

References

External links
Flinders University webpage for Kristine Gebbe
Kristine Gebbie biographical sketch as President of the Board of Directors for the World Association for Emergency and Disaster Medicine 
AIDS Czar Kristine Gebbie Commends Drug Czar for National Drug Strategy

1943 births
2022 deaths
American nursing administrators
United States Department of Health and Human Services officials
State cabinet secretaries of Washington (state)
Columbia University faculty
Columbia University School of Nursing faculty
University of Michigan School of Public Health alumni
UCLA School of Nursing alumni
St. Olaf College alumni
Nursing educators
Nursing researchers
People from Sioux City, Iowa
People from Miles City, Montana
People from Albuquerque, New Mexico
Clinton administration personnel
Members of the National Academy of Medicine